Fábio da Silva Moreira (born 14 March 1972 in Brazil) is a Brazilian retired footballer.

References

Brazilian footballers
Association football defenders
Living people
1972 births
Vitória F.C. players
S.C. Salgueiros players
G.D. Chaves players
Middlesbrough F.C. players